Gérard César (born 19 December 1934 in Bordeaux, Gironde) is a member of the Senate of France.  He represents the Gironde department, and is a member of the Union for a Popular Movement.

References
Page on the Senate website

1934 births
Living people
Politicians from Bordeaux
Rally for the Republic politicians
Union for a Popular Movement politicians
Gaullism, a way forward for France
The Republicans (France) politicians
Deputies of the 5th National Assembly of the French Fifth Republic
Deputies of the 6th National Assembly of the French Fifth Republic
Deputies of the 8th National Assembly of the French Fifth Republic
French Senators of the Fifth Republic
Senators of Gironde